Erich Leo Lehmann (20 November 1917 – 12 September 2009) was a German-born American statistician, who made a major contribution to nonparametric hypothesis testing. He is one of the eponyms of the Lehmann–Scheffé theorem and of the Hodges–Lehmann estimator of the median of a population.

Early life
Lehmann was born in Strasbourg, Alsace-Lorraine in 1917 to a family of Ashkenazi Jewish ancestry. He grew up in Frankfurt am Main, Germany, until the Machtergreifung in 1933 his family fled to Switzerland to escape the Nazis. He graduated from high school in Zurich, and studied mathematics for two years at Trinity College, Cambridge. Following that, he emigrated to the United States, arriving in New York in late 1940. He enrolled in University of California, Berkeley as a post-graduate student—albeit without a prior degree—in 1941.

Career
Lehmann obtained his MA in mathematics in 1942 and his PhD (under Jerzy Neyman) in 1946, at the University of California, Berkeley, where he taught from 1942. From August 1944 to August 1945 he worked as an operations analyst for the United States Air Force on Guam.  He taught at Columbia University and at Princeton University during 1950–51, and then during 1951–1952 he was a visiting associate professor at Stanford University.

He was an editor of the Annals of Mathematical Statistics and president of the Institute of Mathematical Statistics, and a member of the American Academy of Arts and Sciences and the National Academy of Sciences.

In 1977 he married another statistician, Juliet Popper Shaffer, whom he had met four years earlier as the sponsor to her sabbatical visit to Berkeley. In the same year, Shaffer moved from being a psychology professor at the University of Kansas to a lecturer position in statistics at Berkeley.

In 1997, on the occasion of his eightieth birthday, the department of statistics at the University of California at Berkeley created the Erich Lehmann Fund in Statistics to support the students of the department.

Selected publications

Books
 Testing Statistical Hypotheses, 1959
 Basic Concepts of Probability and Statistics, 1964, co-author  J. L. Hodges
 Elements of Finite Probability, 1965, co-author  J. L. Hodges
 
 Theory of Point Estimation, 1983
 
 Reminiscences of a Statistician, 2007, 
 Fisher, Neyman, and the Creation of Classical Statistics, 2011,  [published posthumously]

Articles

References

Further reading

External links
 

1917 births
2009 deaths
University of California, Berkeley alumni
University of California, Berkeley faculty
American statisticians
Fellows of the American Statistical Association
Presidents of the Institute of Mathematical Statistics
Members of the United States National Academy of Sciences
Mathematical statisticians